Seeds of Hope is the second full-length album by the Japanese reggae punk band SiM, released on October 12, 2011. It reached 55th place on the Oricon weekly chart and charted for 18 weeks.

Track listing

Personnel
 Manabu Taniguti (MAH) — vocals
 Masahira Iida (SHOW-HATE) — guitars, keyboards
 Shinya Shinohara (SIN) — bass guitar
 Yuya Taniguchi (GODRi) — drums

References

2011 albums
SiM (band) albums